The 2016–17 AS Nancy Lorraine season is the 49th professional season of the club since its creation in 1967. It's their 1st season back in Ligue 1 after their promotion from Ligue 2 in the 2015–16 season.

Players

French teams are limited to four players without EU citizenship. Hence, the squad list includes only the principal nationality of each player; several non-European players on the squad have dual citizenship with an EU country. Also, players from the ACP countries—countries in Africa, the Caribbean, and the Pacific that are signatories to the Cotonou Agreement—are not counted against non-EU quotas due to the Kolpak ruling.

Squad

Out on loan

Transfers 

In:

Out:

Competitions

Ligue 1

League table

Results summary

Results by round

Matches

References

AS Nancy Lorraine seasons
Nancy